Clausel, is a Luxembourgish beer brand founded by microbrewery Letzebuerger Stad Brauerei in 2007.

History

The microbrewery Letzebuerger Stad Brauerei was founded 2007 in Luxembourg City. They brew their beer brand Clausel in the old Mousel brewery in Clausen district in Luxembourg City. As of 2016 Clausel is the only beer brewed in Luxembourg's capital city. 
The name Clausel comes from adding the names Clausen (the district where it is brewed) and Mousel (the last beer brand brewed in the same brewery). (CLAUSEL = CLAUsen + mouSEL).

Economy

Beers
The following beers are sold under the Clausel name:

 Clausel Classic (Pilsner)
 Clausel Gezwickelt (Unfiltered beer) 
 Clausel Monk (First Abbaye beer in Luxembourg)
 Clausel Black Münster (Light pale Ale)

See also
 Beer in Luxembourg
 Brasserie Nationale
 Brasserie de Luxembourg

References

External links
 Official website

Breweries in Luxembourg
Food and drink companies established in 2007
Brands of Luxembourg